Liu Jinli (born March 16, 1989, in Qiqihar, Heilongjiang) is an internationally elite curler from China.

She curls out of the club in Heilongjiang and is currently a member of the Chinese National Team.

As a member of the National Team she will compete for Team China at the 2010 Winter Olympics in Vancouver, British Columbia. She is the Alternate for the team.

Teammates 
2010 Vancouver Olympic Games
Wang Bingyu, Skip
Liu Yin, Third
Yue Qingshuang, Second
Zhou Yan, Lead

References

External links

1989 births
Living people
Chinese female curlers
Curlers at the 2010 Winter Olympics
Curlers at the 2018 Winter Olympics
Olympic bronze medalists for China
Olympic curlers of China
Sportspeople from Qiqihar
Olympic medalists in curling
Medalists at the 2010 Winter Olympics
Asian Games medalists in curling
Curlers at the 2017 Asian Winter Games
Medalists at the 2017 Asian Winter Games
Asian Games gold medalists for China
Universiade medalists in curling
Pacific-Asian curling champions
Universiade gold medalists for China
Competitors at the 2009 Winter Universiade